Äktenskapsbrottaren is a 1964 Swedish comedy film directed by Hasse Ekman. The film is based on Georges Feydeau and Maurice Desvallières play  L'Hôtel du libre échange from 1894.

Cast
Gunnar Björnstrand as Emil Fäger, photographer
Siv Ericks as Agnes Fäger, Emils wife
Carl-Gustaf Lindstedt as Hjalmar Korpulin
Birgitta Andersson as Isabella Korpulin, Hjalmars wife
Sven Lindberg as Pettersson-Rask, habitual offender
Anna Sundqvist as Svea, Fägers maid
Gösta Ekman as Sixten, Korpulins nephew, studio assistant
Stig Grybe as Bror Victorin
Olof Thunberg as Commissioner Vilja 
Sune Mangs as Paavo, right-hand man at Hotel Eros 
John Melin as Purén, hotel manager and porter
Sigge Fürst as conductor
Nils Eklund as Klemming, javelin-man
Sonja Karlsson as Tilda, Victorins daughter 
Desirée Edlund as Hilda, Victorins daughter  
Birgitta Svensson as Milda, Victorins daughter 
Lis Nilheim as Vilda, Victorins daughter 
Bellan Roos as Clerk of the power storage
Georg Skarstedt as the priest

References

External links

1964 films
Films directed by Hasse Ekman
Swedish comedy films
1960s Swedish-language films
Swedish films based on plays
Films based on works by Georges Feydeau
Adultery in films
Films set in hotels
Films set in 1912
1960s Swedish films